Miguel Suárez (born 1 June 1993) is a Bolivian footballer who plays as a forward for Independiente Petrolero.

References

External links
 
 

1993 births
Living people
Bolivian footballers
Club Bolívar players
Universitario de Sucre footballers
C.D. Jorge Wilstermann players
Club San José players
Club Always Ready players
Nacional Potosí players
Club Independiente Petrolero players
Bolivian Primera División players
Bolivia international footballers
Association football forwards